Odai Khadr Salem Al-Qarra is a Jordanian footballer who plays for Al-Nahda of Oman and the Jordan national football team.

International career
Khadr made his senior international debut for Jordan against Libya in an international friendly on 9 August 2013 in Amman, in their 2–1 win.

International goals

With U-22

Honors and Participation in International Tournaments

AFC Asian Cup 
2019 AFC Asian Cup

In WAFF Championships 
2014 WAFF Championship

References

External links 
 
 Odai Khadr at Goal.com 

1991 births
Association football defenders
Jordanian footballers
Jordan international footballers
Jordan youth international footballers
Jordanian people of Palestinian descent
Living people
Jordanian Pro League players
Shabab Al-Ordon Club players
Al-Ramtha SC players
Al-Baqa'a Club players
Al-Hussein SC (Irbid) players
Shabab Al-Aqaba Club players
Al-Faisaly SC players
Sahab SC players
Ma'an SC players
Oman Professional League players
Dhofar Club players
Al-Nahda Club (Oman) players
Jordanian expatriate footballers
Jordanian expatriate sportspeople in Oman
Expatriate footballers in Oman
2019 AFC Asian Cup players